The Mira Loma Arcade Creek Project is an ongoing study of the riparian corridor of an urban watershed in Sacramento, California. It consists of eleven studies which measure the health of Arcade Creek and is run entirely by students of Mira Loma High School and five faculty advisers. As of 2017, there were 346 students participating in the project.

The project was initiated in 1998 as part of the school's IB Group 4 project.
In 2004, the project was recognised by Governor Schwarzenegger when it was awarded the Governor's Environmental and Economic Leadership Award, California's most prestigious environmental honour.

The project was also awarded a $10,000 environmental excellence award from SeaWorld in 2010.

List of studies 

Bio Assay

Bio Assay tests the health of the creek's water using the indicator species Ceriodaphnia dubia which is highly sensitive to toxins and other changes in the creek's water.

Biological Assessment

Biological Assessment monitors populations of macroinvertebrates in the creek bed. Large populations of species in the insect orders Ephemeroptera, Plecoptera and Trichoptera.  indicate good health of the creek.

Botany

The Botany Study monitors the populations of plant life in the riparian corridor of the creek with a special emphasis on controlling invasive species.

Chemistry

The Chemistry Study monitors the chemical content of the creek water. Measurements of dissolved oxygen, pH, temperature, and various metallic ions are taken. This data can then be used to determine if the water is chemically appropriate for most life at the creek.

Habitat

The Habitat Study measures various physical features of the creek to provide a general description of its health. The group measures water depth, vegetation density, and average tree diameters.

Long Mapping

The Long Mapping Study maps the general shape and flow of the creek bed including creek bank height and soil build-up or erosion. The Long Mapping group provides a geographical reference for other studies to pinpoint locations at the creek.

Outreach

The Outreach group presents the tasks, results, and accomplishments of the Arcade Creek Project to the wider community and organizes events to educate schoolchildren, politicians, and environmentalists.

Restoration

The Restoration group removes garbage, toxins, and invasive species from Arcade Creek in hopes of restoring it to a more natural state.

Sediment

The Sediment Study monitors the composition of the benthic layer of the creek bed. The presence of an excess of rocks, clay, or silt indicates that the creek's soil is inappropriate for most life at the creek.

Technology

The Technology team is responsible for compiling creek data and publicizing the Arcade Creek Project through informational videos and the arcade creek website.

Vertebrates

The Vertebrate Study monitors the populations of vertebrate species at the creek. By tracking population changes over time, this study aims to determine the ecological health of Arcade Creek.

References

External links 
  Website

Organizations based in Sacramento, California
Ecological restoration